Irina-Camelia Begu and María Irigoyen were the defending champions, but retired in the final against Ysaline Bonaventure and Rebecca Peterson.

Seeds

Draw

Draw

References
 Main Draw

Rio Open - Women's Doubles
Rio
Rio Open